John Minor Crawford House, also known as Building 301, is a historic home located at Monongahela Township in Greene County, Pennsylvania. It was built about 1878, and is a -story, four bay, brick Italianate-style dwelling.  It has a shallow pitched roof and tall, narrow windows.  It was converted to a health center in the 1970s and used as such until 1988.  The house was possibly built as part of the "New Geneva Glass Works Lot."

It was listed on the National Register of Historic Places in 1995.

References 

Houses on the National Register of Historic Places in Pennsylvania
Italianate architecture in Pennsylvania
Houses completed in 1878
Houses in Greene County, Pennsylvania
National Register of Historic Places in Greene County, Pennsylvania